Colin G. Pooley (born 1950) is a specialist in transport and migration studies who is professor emeritus of social and historical geography at the University of Lancaster where he worked from 1975 until 2012.

Background
Pooley was born in Lincolnshire and moved to Liverpool (to university) in 1969. He attended the University of Liverpool, graduating with an honours degree in Geography in 1972 (Rural economy and agricultural change in the upper Itchen Valley, 1500-1800) and PhD in Geography in 1979 (Migration, mobility and residential areas in nineteenth-century Liverpool). He began teaching at Lancaster University in 1975, remaining until retirement and occupying several administrative roles including head of the former Department of Geography. He was associated with the former Centre for North-West Regional Studies, and latterly Lancaster's Centre for Mobilities Research.

Scholarship
Pooley works on the social and historical geography of Britain and continental Europe since the eighteenth century. He began his career investigating housing, health, crime, ethnicity and social change, notably in Liverpool.

His more recent research has been on migration, mobility and sustainable urban travel, with one current (2018) project conducting comparative analyses of sustainable urban mobility in Europe, and culture and society from the 1890s to the present. His research techniques have included archival work, travel diaries, policy analysis and qualitative research techniques.

He is the author of numerous volumes and articles on these topics.

Selected publications
 
 
 
 
 
 
 
 
 
 
 
 
 Pooley, C. and Pooley, M.  (2022), Everyday Mobilities in Nineteenth- and Twentieth-Century British Diaries, London: Palgrave Macmillan,

References 

Living people
Alumni of the University of Liverpool
Academics of Lancaster University
Social geographers
1950 births